Gisborne Secondary College is a co-educational secondary school located in Gisborne, Victoria, established in 1981. The current enrolment is 1031 students. Students attend from years seven to twelve. The college serves a large proportion of the southern Macedon Ranges district in Victoria, with over 800 students attending school via school bus.

Learning centres
Students in years 7 and 8 are educated in two learning centres. Students attend their core classes in the learning centres, but use specialist classrooms for technology, health and physical education, music, drama and some science classes. Each learning centre has a leader (Coordinator) and a core group of teachers who each teach half of the students in their specialist subject area.

Senior school
 The senior school starts in year 10, and students can elect to study through a number of pathways to reach a senior school qualification. Students study towards the Victorian Certificate of Education (VCE), the Victorian Certificate of Applied Learning (VCAL), as well as Vocational Education and Training in Schools (VETiS) programs and School-based Apprenticeships and Traineeships.

The VCE, which is the main secondary student assessment program in Victoria, ranks students with an Australian Tertiary Admission Rank (ATAR) for university entrance purposes.

Performing arts
The college has achieved some success in performing arts across Victoria in recent years, including prizes for the Rock Eisteddfod Challenge:
 First Place - 2011 - Melbourne Raw Division grand final results
 Second Place - 2007 - Open Division
 Third Place - 2004 - Melbourne Grand Final, Premier Division
 First Place - 2002 - Melbourne Grand Final, Open Division

The college also achieved five awards for the 2013 Wakakirri Secondary School Story Dance Challenge (Victoria), including:
 Best Overall Costume Design
 Best Individual Piece Of Set
 Best Lighting Design
 Best Singing Performance
 Best Individual Costume Design (Nomination)

Notable alumni
Australian representative athlete Troy de Haas attended the school from 1992 to 1998. Members of the musical group Stonefield attended the school when they won the 2010 Triple J Unearthed High competition.

See also
 List of schools in Victoria
 Victorian Certificate of Education

References

External links
 Gisborne Secondary College Official Website

Public high schools in Victoria (Australia)
Rock Eisteddfod Challenge participants